In geography, an abîme is a vertical shaft in karst terrain that may be very deep and usually opens into a network of subterranean passages.<ref>Whittow, John (1984). Dictionary of Physical Geography'’. London: Penguin, 1984, p. 11. .</ref> The term is borrowed from French, where it means abyss or chasm.

Definition

Formation
Abîmes are a structure which form late in the life of a limestone cave. They can be 1–10 metres in diameter and up to 50 metres in height vertically. The walls have grooves that serve as a contrast to the smooth nature of the rest of the cave. They are known to lie under heads of stream valleys, sinkholes, or along non-carbonated rocks. Water will occasionally fall down the shaft, creating subterranean waterfalls. Only a small portion of the abîme connects to the rest of the cavern. They can extend to the present water table, while the rest of the cavern lies above it.

Other names
Abîme are also known as pit caves in the U.S. and pot caves in England. They can also be called domepits, due to the way that looking up from below a dome can be seen and looking down from above a pit is seen. Blue holes are sinkholes that have filled with water and can occur on land or at sea. In Central America, they are called cenotes.

Fauna

Invertebrates
 Millipede
 Can live anywhere in a cave, including on the steep sides of the abîme
 They feed on humus and fungi
 They have less body pigment, thinner shells, longer legs and antennae, fewer eye facets, and longer sensory bristles than their land-dwelling cousins (Moore and Sullivan, 1997)
 Glowworms
 Live on walls and ceilings but can live anywhere inside or outside the cave.
 They can control the amount of bioluminescence they release and can glow for 24 hours a day
 They use long strings of sticky silk like material as “fishing lines” to capture small bugs
 Cave Beetles
 There are 200+ known species of cave beetles.
 They are blind and have no optic nerve along with long appendages and powerful jaws.
 They feed on millipedes, other cave beetles, insects and larvae, along with guano and bat carcasses
 Cave beetles are considered troglobites since they live in entire darkness though, they may be seen on the abîme sides
 Cave Crickets
 These crickets migrate between caves and the outside and feed on cave beetles
 Other species
 Spiders
 Mites
 Ticks
 Wintering animals
 Moths, wasps and ichneumon flies use the areas as wintering ground

Vertebrates
 Snakes
 These snakes do not normally live in caves but can be found at the entrances to abîmes
 Snakes do occasionally fall into sinkholes caused by abîmes
 One species of snake uses caves as a hunting ground for bats
 Bats
 Bats use abîmes as an area to enter and leave caves.
 They feed the invertebrates with their guano and carcasses
 Birds
 Birds will use the walls as nesting roosts
 Examples being cliff swallows, cave swallows, etc.

Recreation

Rappelling (A.K.A. Pit Caving)
This is the act of using ropes, harnesses and ladders to descend an abîme. This is the most popular activity besides the actual exploration of caves. It is also the most dangerous activity to do in a cave. The biggest danger comes from using poor ropes and ladders for rappelling down shafts. Many amateurs make this mistake and it leads to the most cave deaths.

Base cave jumping (Cave of Swallows, Mexico)
An extreme sport and requiring a person to stand at the entrance of an abîme and jump into the opening while pulling a parachute before hitting the cave floor. This is highly dangerous and should only be undertaken by those with experience. The Cave of Swallows is the most popular due to its 333 m. (1,094 ft.) freefall drop, which is the longest in the Western hemisphere.

 Popular examples 
 Cave of Swallows, Mexico
 Hellhole (cave), West Virginia
 El Capitan Pit, Prince of Wales Island, Alaska
 Vrtiglavica Cave, Slovenia
 Pozzo del Merro, Italy (Deepest blue hole, 392m)

 See also 
 
 

References

 Literature 
 "Cave of Swallows." Wikipedia. Wikimedia Foundation, n.d. Web. 04 Dec. 2015.
 Jennings, J. N., and J. N. Jennings. Karst Geomorphology. Oxford, UK: B. Blackwell, 1985. Print.
 Lübke, Anton. The World of Caves. New York: Coward-McCann, n.d. Print.
 Moore, George William, and G. Nicholas Sullivan. Speleology: Caves and the Cave Environment. St. Louis: Cave, 1997. Print.
 "Pit Cave." Wikipedia''. Wikimedia Foundation, n.d. Web. 04 Dec. 2015.

Karst formations
Dinaric Alps
Dinaric karst formations